BC Alita was a basketball club from Alytus, Lithuania. It was founded in 1995, when the BC Savy Vilnius headquarters moved the club to Alytus, as part of the geographical expansion of the LKL. The team was named after its sponsor, Alita.

BC Alita ceased operations in 2005. They were succeeded by BC Alytus the same year.

Achievements

Notable players
  Tomas Pačėsas 
  Rytis Vaišvila
  Gvidonas Markevičius
  Algimantas Pavilonis
  Stanislav Medvedenko
  Darjuš Lavrinovič
  Kšyštof Lavrinovič
  Gintaras Kadžiulis
  Žygimantas Jonušas
  Tadas Klimavičius
  Saulius Kazevičius
  Nerijus Varnelis

References

Basketball teams in Lithuania
Sport in Alytus